Swedish Educational Broadcasting Company ( or Utbildningsradion, UR) is a public-service corporation dedicated to serving the needs of the Swedish general public by providing educational programming on radio and television.

The company is a member of the European Broadcasting Union and Nordvision.

History
In 1931, Radiotjänst became the principal for its broadcasts. In 1961, test broadcasts of school television began, an activity that in 1964 merged with school radio. To this was later added SR's adult education and the activity was financed with tax funds.

In 1967, Kommittén för Television och Radio i Utbildningen (TRU), the committee for television and radio, was started in the education of the state as an experimental activity of sending wireless teaching materials to universities and preschools. The location was in Stocksund and the business continued until 1978 when it was taken over by the newly started Sveriges Utbildningsradio AB.

In 1978, an extensive reorganization was carried out in which Sveriges Radio (SR) was split into four subsidiaries owned by SR:  (RR), Swedish National Radio;  (LRAB), Swedish Local Radio; Sveriges Utbildningsradio (UR), Swedish Educational Broadcasting; and Sveriges Television (SVT), Swedish Television. In 1985, the tax financing ceased and UR's program was financed by the television fee. In 1994, another reorganization was made and UR became an independent company.

Between 1999 and 2006, a series of books on the history of educational programs and UR have been published by . A total of 16 volumes were published in this series of publications. In 2016, UR was rejected by the Discrimination Ombudsman after placing a job advertisement where dark skin color was included in the applicant's qualifications.

Distribution
UR broadcasts their programming on Sveriges Radio's channels P1, P2, P3 and P4 as well as Sveriges Television's SVT1, SVT2 and SVT Barn. On 27 September 2004, Kunskapskanalen (The Knowledge Channel) started broadcasting. The channel is run as a collaborative project between UR and SVT. Each company accounts for fifty percent of the content and airtime.

Management
CEOs:

 (1977–1986)
 (1986–1998)
Rolf Svensson (1998–1999, acting)
 (2000–2009)
 (2009–2015)
 (2015–2017)
Per Bergkrantz (2017–2018, acting)
 (2018–)

See also 
Educational television
Radiotjänst i Kiruna (licence fee agency)
Swedish Broadcasting Commission

References

External links

  
 Official site: About UR

Foundation Management for SR, SVT, and UR
European Broadcasting Union members
Radio in Sweden
Television in Sweden
Swedish companies established in 1978
Educational broadcasting
Education companies of Sweden
Television production companies of Sweden
Companies based in Stockholm